Avan is a 2010 Indian Malayalam-language film directed by Nandan Kavil. Written by Sumod-Gopu, the film stars Bala, Vijay Yesudas and Muktha George. This film marks the debut film of the popular South Indian playback singer Vijay Yesudas as an actor.

Plot 
Ramanujan is an established singer. The reality show named Crime And Music forms the backdrop of the story. The specialty of this reality show is that it features a number of convicts taking part in the competition. Krishnan is a goon who is a convict now and is also taking part in this competition. He develops a special relationship with Ramanujan, which leads to many unexpected twists in their lives.

Cast

Reception
Veeyen of Nowrunning opined that "At the end of it, Avan is a bit overwrought and wholly fails to move you. There is nothing intriguing in it that would send your pulses racing. The excitement is minimal and so is its emotional depth".

References

External links 
 MALAYALAM Movies - Avan Gallery - IndiaGlitz.com
 Events - 'Avan' On Location - IndiaGlitz.com
 Avan - Movie Reviews, Videos, Wallpapers, Photos, Cast & Crew, Story & Synopsis on popcorn.oneindia.in

2010 films
2010s Malayalam-language films